Cyclin dependent kinase 13 is an enzyme that in humans is encoded by the CDK13 gene.

The protein encoded by this gene is a member of the cyclin-dependent serine/threonine protein kinase family. Members of this family are well known for their essential roles as master switches in cell cycle control. Some of the cell cycle control kinases are able to phosphorylate proteins that are important for cell differentiation and apoptosis, thus provide connections between cell proliferation, differentiation, and apoptosis. Proteins of this family may also be involved in non-cell cycle-related functions, such as neurocytoskeleton dynamics. The exact function of this protein has not yet been determined. It has unusually large N- and C-termini and is ubiquitously expressed in many tissues. Two alternatively spliced variants are described.

Clinical significance 
Mutations in CDK13 cause CDK13-related disorder. A 2017 study of children with rare developmental disorders found 11 children in the United Kingdom who had a fault in their CDK13 gene. This fault affected the children's communication and language skills as well as causing learning difficulties.

References

External links

Further reading

EC 2.7.11